The 1983–84 season of the Moroccan Throne Cup was the 28th edition of the competition.

FAR de Rabat won the cup, beating Renaissance de Kénitra 1–0 in the final, played at the stade Mohamed V in Casablanca. FAR de Rabat won the cup for the third time in their history.

Tournament

Last 16

Quarter-finals

Semi-finals

Final 
The final took place between the two winning semi-finalists, FAR de Rabat and Renaissance de Kénitra, on 8 July 1984 at the Stade Mohamed V in Casablanca.

Notes and references 

1983
1983 in association football
1984 in association football
1983–84 in Moroccan football